The Kreativ Dental European Tour 2014/2015 – Event 5 (also known as the 2014 Kreativ Dental Lisbon Open) was a professional minor-ranking snooker tournament that took place between 11 and 14 December 2014 at the Casal Vistoso Sports Centre in Lisbon, Portugal.

The tournament was the first ever professional snooker event in Portugal, the final of which attracted more than a thousand spectators. Over a dozen Portuguese amateur players took part, including national champion Rui Santos.

Ben Woollaston made the 110th official maximum break during his last 128 match against Joe Steele. This was Woollaston's first official 147 break and also the fifth maximum break in the 2014/2015 season.

Stephen Maguire won his third minor-ranking event by defeating Matthew Selt 4–2 in the final. The Lisbon Open was Selt's first professional final.

Prize fund 
The breakdown of prize money of the event is shown below:

Main draw

Preliminary rounds

Round 1 
Best of 7 frames

Round 2 
Best of 7 frames

Main rounds

Top half

Section 1

Section 2

Section 3

Section 4

Bottom half

Section 5

Section 6

Section 7

Section 8

Finals

Century breaks 

 147  Ben Woollaston
 143  Barry Hawkins
 141, 101  Matthew Stevens
 140, 104, 100  Alfie Burden
 139, 116  Judd Trump
 138  Marco Fu
 137, 123  Andrew Higginson
 131, 117, 101  John Higgins
 131, 114  Kurt Maflin
 128  Mitchell Mann
 125  Jamie Jones
 122, 115  Craig Steadman
 119, 118  Aditya Mehta
 118  Joe Perry
 112  Allan Taylor
 110, 102, 100  Stephen Maguire
 110  Gerard Greene

 109  Thepchaiya Un-Nooh
 108  Anthony Hamilton
 106  Michael Holt
 106  Graeme Dott
 105, 101  Dominic Dale
 105  Marcus Campbell
 105  Richard Beckham
 105  Tian Pengfei
 105  Jack Lisowski
 104  Chris Melling
 104  Mark King
 104  Mark Davis
 103  Joe Swail
 103  Alex Davies
 103  Peter Ebdon
 101  Xiao Guodong
 100, 100  David Gilbert

References

External links 
 
 2014 Lisbon Open – Pictures by Monique Limbos at Facebook

ET5
2014 in Portuguese sport
Sports competitions in Lisbon
International sports competitions hosted by Portugal
December 2014 sports events in Europe
2010s in Lisbon